David Andrew Griffiths (born 10 September 1985) is an English former professional cricketer who most recently played for Kent County Cricket Club. He is a right arm fast bowler who bats left-handed. Before signing for Kent in 2014, Griffiths had previously played for Hampshire and represented England at under-19 level. Griffiths' contract with Kent expired at the end of the 2016 and was not renewed by the county. In June 2022, Griffiths joined English side Carisbrooke High School Old Boys, marking his debut with a final over victory at the Victoria Recreation Ground.

Youth career
Born on the Isle of Wight, Griffiths was a member of the Hampshire Academy. He played for the England under-19 team against Bangladesh under-19s in 2004 and toured Malaysia and India with the side in 2005, playing a total of three Under-19 Test matches and four Under-19 One Day Internationals. He signed his first professional contract with Hampshire in November 2004 but spent much of the 2005 season injured.

Senior cricket career
Griffiths made his first-class cricket debut for Hampshire in 2006, becoming the seventh player born on the Isle of Wight to represent the county. Griffiths played a total of 36 first-class matches for Hampshire as well as playing for the county in List A cricket and Twenty20 matches. After a number of injuries he was released by the county at the end of the 2013 season.

Griffiths signed for Kent in September 2013, making his debut for the county in 2014. Injuries restricted him to bowling only 63 overs during the 2014 season and limited him to only two T20 appearances in 2015 before his season was cut short by triceps and back injuries which required surgery. Griffiths returned to the Kent side in May 2016 in a T20 match against Somerset, a format in which he has often been employed as a "death" bowler, bowling the final overs of an innings. Griffiths left Kent when his contract expired in September 2016.

References

External links

1985 births
Living people
English cricketers
Hampshire cricketers
Berkshire cricketers
Kent cricketers
People from Newport, Isle of Wight
English cricketers of the 21st century